Young and Wild is a 1958 American crime film directed by William Witney and written by Arthur T. Horman. The film stars Gene Evans, Scott Marlowe, Carolyn Kearney, Robert Arthur, Weston Gavin and Tom Gilson. The film was released on April 24, 1958, by Republic Pictures.

Plot

Cast       
Gene Evans as Det. Sgt. Fred Janusz
Scott Marlowe as Richard Edward 'Rick' Braden
Carolyn Kearney as Valerie Whitman
Robert Arthur as Jerry Coltrin
Weston Gavin as 'Allie' Allison 
Tom Gilson as Bruce 'Beejay' Phillips
Ken Lynch as David Whitman
Emlen Davies as Mrs. Whitman
Morris Ankrum as Police Capt. Egan
Wendell Holmes as Lewis J. Christopher
John Zaremba as Sgt. Larsen

References

External links 
 

1958 films
1950s English-language films
American crime films
1958 crime films
Republic Pictures films
Films directed by William Witney
1950s American films